Dragutin Golub (born 29 August 1987) is a Croatian retired football right back.

Club career
He spent the last years of his career in the Austrian lower leagues.

International career
Dragutin was a part of the Croatian national under-21 team.

References

External links

1987 births
Living people
Footballers from Zagreb
Association football fullbacks
Croatian footballers
NK Lučko players
NK Hrvatski Dragovoljac players
NK Moslavina players
FC Koper players
NK Međimurje players
NK Celje players
NK Rudeš players
HNK Šibenik players
NK Bistra players
Croatian Football League players
Slovenian PrvaLiga players
First Football League (Croatia) players
Croatian expatriate footballers
Expatriate footballers in Slovenia
Croatian expatriate sportspeople in Slovenia
Expatriate footballers in Austria
Croatian expatriate sportspeople in Austria